Bakairi or Bacairi may refer to:
 Bakairi people, an ethnic group of Brazil
 Bakairi language, a language of Brazil

See also 
 Bakeri (disambiguation)
 Bakari (disambiguation)

Language and nationality disambiguation pages